The Bandy World Championship for women 2006, the second bandy world championship tournament for women, was held in Roseville, Minnesota in the United States on February 13–18, 2006. Host of the event was the American Bandy Association. In the final-game Sweden defeated Russia, 3-1. It also marked the Canadian women's national bandy team's first international appearance in bandy.

Participating nations

Venue

Premier tour 
 14 February
  Finland –  Russia : 0–8
  Sweden –  USA : 7–0
  Canada –  Norway : 0–4
  Sweden –  Russia : 7–1
  Finland –  USA : 2–0

 15 February
  Sweden –  Norway : 8–1
  Finland –  Canada : 3–1
  Russia –  USA : 7–0
  Norway –  Finland : 4–2
  Canada –  Russia : 0–7

 16 February
  Sweden –  Canada : 5–0
  USA –  Norway : 1–1
  Sweden –  Finland : 5–0
  Russia –  Norway : 1–1
  USA –  Canada : 0–1

Final Tour

Match for 5th place 
  USA –  Canada : 2–0

Semifinals 
 17 February
  Russia –  Norway : 2–0
  Sweden –  Finland : 4–0

Match for 3rd place 
 18 February
  Norway –  Finland : 2–1

Final 
 18 February
  Sweden –  Russia : 3–1

References

External links 
2006 Women's Bandy World Championship

2006
Women's Bandy World Championship
Roseville, Minnesota
Bandy World Championship
Women's World Championship
International bandy competitions hosted by the United States
 
Women's Bandy World Championship
Sports competitions in Minnesota